KSCI (channel 18) is a television station licensed to Long Beach, California, United States, serving the Los Angeles area. Owned by WRNN-TV Associates, the station airs programming from ShopHQ. KSCI's studios are located on South Bundy Drive in West Los Angeles, and its transmitter is located atop Mount Harvard. KSCI served as a multicultural independent station until June 2021.

History

1960s 
The channel 18 allocation in Los Angeles was previously occupied by KCHU-TV, which was licensed to San Bernardino and signed on the air on August 1, 1962, before it went off the air in June 1964. The station was owned by the San Bernardino Sun-Telegram. KSCI signed on the air on June 30, 1977, operating from studios in West Los Angeles, although still licensed in San Bernardino. It became a non-profit owned by the Transcendental Meditation movement (the call letters stood for Maharishi Mahesh Yogi's theoretical "Science of Creative Intelligence"). The station broadcast news stories, prerecorded lectures and variety shows with TM celebrities. KSCI's goal was to report "only good news"; sister stations were planned for San Francisco and Washington, D.C. The station manager was Mark Fleischer, son of Hollywood director Richard Fleischer.

1980s 
In 1980, KSCI switched to a for-profit operation and earned $1 million on revenues of $8 million in 1985. In November 1985, the station loaned $350,000 to Maharishi International University in Iowa. By June 1986, the station's content began to consist of "a hodgepodge of programming" in 14 languages. They had dubbed themselves the "international station" and claimed to offer the most diverse ethnic television programming in the early 1980s. Almost all Iranian American television programs in the early 1980s were on KSCI.

In October 1986, the station was purchased by its general manager and an investor for $40.5 million.

1990s 
In 1990, the station was sold to Intercontinental Television Group Inc., with programming being produced by Wahid Boctor of Arab American Television. In 1998, KSCI transferred its city of license from San Bernardino to Long Beach. In 2000, a Korean newspaper, The Hankook Ilbo, took over the International Media Group (IMG), which operated KSCI. IMG was re-launched as the AsianMedia Group, Inc., who purchased the station.

2000s 
By 2005, the station was broadcasting seven English-language and three Spanish-language newscasts plus "local news programs in Vietnamese, Mandarin Chinese, and Korean" to 2.5 million Asian-American viewers in Southern California. In early 2005, KSCI changed its on-air branding to "LA18." 

In October 2008, KSCI broadcast the Presidential debate along with translation in Mandarin and offered political analysis by their news staff. The broadcast was one of several that covered election events in Korean, Mandarin, Cantonese, Vietnamese and Filipino languages.

2010s 
On January 9, 2012, KSCI, Inc. filed a voluntary petition for reorganization under Chapter 11 bankruptcy protection to the U.S. Bankruptcy Court for the District of Delaware. On August 11, 2012, KSCI was purchased by NRJ TV LLC, a company which has acquired smaller television stations in various U.S. cities for the possibility of placing their spectrum for auction once the Federal Communications Commission rolls out a voluntary spectrum auction for use for non-broadcast purposes in 2014.

On June 22, 2017, KSCI announced that they had canceled all of its programming in Chinese, Filipino, Spanish, and Armenian and replaced it with English-language infomercials beginning July 1. The subchannels of the station continued to air its programs in Chinese and Armenian, but as a result of the station's programming cutbacks, KSCI also announced they reduced its Korean programming from 8 to 11 p.m. and would cut its subchannels list from 12 to 5 the following year.

On September 12, 2017, KSCI's parent company NRJ TV LLC announced that they would sell its Poway translator station, KUAN-LD, to the NBCUniversal Owned Television Stations group (owners of KNBC/KVEA and KNSD), for $650,000; the sale was completed on December 21, 2017.

Sale to RNN 
On December 9, 2019, it was announced that WRNN-TV Associates, owner of New York City–based WRNN-TV, secured a deal to purchase seven full-power TV stations (including KSCI) and one Class A station from NRJ. The sale was approved by the FCC on January 23, and was completed on February 4, 2020.

From February 1 until February 4, 2020, WRNN-TV Associates operated KSCI under a short-term local marketing agreement (LMA) while it awaited full consummation of its purchase. KSCI began airing WRNN-TV's independent network RNN on its primary channel. RNN's schedule consists primarily of infomercials, with occasional religious, E/I, and news/talk programs.

On May 30, 2021, it was announced that KSCI (along with its sister stations owned by WRNN-TV Associates) would become an affiliate of the ShopHQ 24/7 channel on June 28, 2021.

Technical information

Subchannels
The station's digital signal is multiplexed:

Analog-to-digital conversion
KSCI shut down its analog signal, over UHF channel 18, on June 12, 2009, as part of the federally mandated transition from analog to digital television. The station's digital signal relocated from its pre-transition UHF channel 61, which was among the high band UHF channels (52-69) that were removed from broadcasting use as a result of the transition, to its former analog-era UHF channel 18.

References

External links
WRNN-TV profile
 Lengthy Los Angeles Times story about beneficial effect of station

SCI
Korean-language television stations
Japanese-language television stations
SCI
SCI
Television channels and stations established in 1977
1977 establishments in California